Roxanne H. Jones (May 3, 1928 – May 19, 1996) was an American social activist and politician who served as a Democratic member of the Pennsylvania State Senate for the 3rd district from 1986 to 1996. She was the first African-American woman to serve in the Pennsylvania State Senate and the second woman to serve in the Senate since Flora M. Vare in 1928.

Early life
Jones was born in South Carolina to Gilford and Mary Beatrice Burton Harper.  She was educated at Edward High School.  She had to rely on welfare support as a young, single mother raising two children on a waitress salary.

Career
Jones served as chair of the Southwark public housing chapter of the Philadelphia Welfare Rights Organization from 1967 to 1968.   She was the founder of Philadelphia Citizens in Action, a board member of the Pennsylvania Minority Business Development Authority, a member of the Martin Luther King Center of Social Change and a member of the National Congress of Black Women.

She was elected to the Pennsylvania State Senate, District 3 in November 1984 and served from 1985 until her death in office in 1996.

Jones died of a heart attack the week after she fought unsuccessfully to defeat Governor Tom Ridge's welfare bill that cut medical benefits to poor Pennsylvanians.

Legacy
A mural of Jones was created on a building on Broad Street in North Philadelphia in her honor.

Notes

References
 

1928 births
1996 deaths
20th-century American women politicians
20th-century American politicians
Activists from Philadelphia
African-American state legislators in Pennsylvania
African-American women in politics
American social activists
Democratic Party Pennsylvania state senators
People from South Carolina
Politicians from Philadelphia
Women state legislators in Pennsylvania
20th-century African-American women
20th-century African-American politicians